Senator Holley may refer to:

Frank H. Holley (1880–1949), Maine State Senate
Jimmy Holley (born 1944), Alabama State Senate